Tatiana Sergeyevna Basova (born 24 June 1984) is a Russian former competitive figure skater. She won silver medals at the Finlandia Trophy and International Cup of Nice and placed 18th at the 2004 European Championships. She was coached by Alexei Mishin.

Programs

Results 
GP: Grand Prix; JGP: Junior Grand Prix

References

External links
 

Russian female single skaters
1984 births
Living people
Figure skaters from Saint Petersburg
Competitors at the 2003 Winter Universiade